Jitendra Singh is a politician from the Bahujan Samaj Party and currently named as the vice president of U.P. Handball Association .In 2007 he was elected as Member of Legislative Assembly representing Bikapur constituency in Faizabad District in the state legislature of Uttar Pradesh.  He was a renowned basketball player.

He was arrested along with Intezar Abidi for attacking and setting fire to the house of State Congress leader Rita Bahuguna in central Lucknow. He is often referred to with epithets such as ""bahubali" don or the "one of the unrivalled don of Eastern Uttar Pradesh".He has been known for the good works in his constituency. A nickname has also been given to him by the people "bablu bhaiya" his brother guddu singh is also mlc from the same  party.

References

Year of birth missing (living people)
Living people
Members of the Uttar Pradesh Legislative Assembly
Pragatisheel Samajwadi Party (Lohiya) politicians
Bahujan Samaj Party politicians from Uttar Pradesh